Nancy Elizabeth González Aceituno is a pageant titleholder, was born in Puerto La Cruz, Venezuela in 1953. She is the Miss World Venezuela titleholder for 1965, and was the official representative of Venezuela to the Miss World 1965 pageant held in London, United Kingdom.

González competed in the national beauty pageant Miss Venezuela 1965 and obtained the title of Miss World Venezuela. She represented the Anzoátegui state.

References

External links
Miss Venezuela Official Website

1943 births
Living people
People from Puerto la Cruz
Miss World 1965 delegates